Southern Cross was a three-masted schooner originally built in 1891 for the Melanesian Mission of the Anglican Church and the Church of the Province of Melanesia, and was lost with all hands off King Island, Tasmania in 1920.

Origins
Southern Cross was built at Wivenhoe, Essex, England by Forrest & Sons using funds estimated at £9,000 contributed by Bishop John Richardson Selwyn and others.  Originally built as a steam yacht, she underwent conversion to a barquentine rig several years later.

Career

On her maiden voyage, she was extensively damaged by a storm in the English Channel during October 1891.  After repair, she left in early November and arrived in Auckland during March 1892.

She was in service with the Melanesian Mission from 1892 to 1902. The engines were removed in 1904 prior to her sale.

Final voyage 
On 11 September 1920, Southern Cross sailed from Melbourne for Hobart with a general cargo including 1,000 cases of benzine stored on its main deck.  On 22 September, a large quantity of wreckage was found on the north coast of King Island.   Further searches found wreckage around the island with a concentration at the southern end.  As the wreckage bore traces of burning, it was speculated that the ship's deck cargo had caught fire, or that it had struck a mine laid by the German raider Wolff in 1917.

The following personnel were reportedly lost in the wrecking - Frank Rule Hodgman, master; T. Watts, mate; C.F. Makepeace, boatswain; D. Dinehy, able seaman; W. O'Connell, able seaman; L. Sward, able seaman; W. Moody, able seaman; Wm. Brown, cook & steward and Stanley Bell, cabin boy.

See also
 Southern Cross (Melanesian Mission ship series)

References

Shipwrecks of Bass Strait
Ships built in Essex
1891 ships
Maritime incidents in 1920
1920 in Australia
King Island (Tasmania)
Ships lost with all hands